Fátima Silva (born May 6, 1970) is a female long-distance runner from Portugal. She set her personal best (2:32:01) in the marathon in 2002 (Hamburg).

Achievements

External links

marathoninfo

1970 births
Living people
Portuguese female long-distance runners
Portuguese female marathon runners
World Athletics Championships athletes for Portugal